Delphine Regease (born 20 February 1984) is a French former artistic gymnast. She competed at the 2000 Summer Olympics.

References

1984 births
Living people
French female artistic gymnasts
Gymnasts at the 2000 Summer Olympics
Olympic gymnasts of France
Mediterranean Games bronze medalists for France
Mediterranean Games medalists in gymnastics
Competitors at the 2001 Mediterranean Games